The  superyacht Faith was launched by Feadship at their yard in Makkum and delivered later that same year as a replacement for the owners previous yacht, now named Flag, which he sold in 2017 to Tommy Hilfiger.

Design 
Both exterior and interior designs are from RWD. The hull is built out of steel while the superstructure is made out of aluminium with teak laid decks. The yacht is classed by Lloyd's Register and flagged in the Cayman Islands.

Amenities 
Zero speed stabilizers, gym, elevator, swimming pool, movie theatre, piano, swimming platform, fire pit, air conditioning, BBQ, beach club, spa room, steam room, hammam, underwater lights, beauty salon. There is also a helicopter landing pad on the bow with a hangar underneath.

Tenders 
 One  Wajer 55
 One  custom Feadship limo tender
 One  custom Feadship Open tender
 One  Nautique Super Air G23 Speed Boa

Recreational toys 
Jet-skis, seabobs, kayaks, scuba gear, water skis, wakesurf board, water skis, windsurf gear, bike.

Performance 
She is powered by twin 3,001hp MTU (16V4000 M63L) diesel engines.

See also
 List of motor yachts by length
 List of yachts built by Feadship

References

2017 ships
Motor yachts
Ships built in the Netherlands